Masterpieces by Ellington is the first LP album by American pianist, composer, and bandleader Duke Ellington, recorded for the Columbia label in 1950. It was one of the earliest 12-inch LPs to take advantage of the extended time available and consisted of four tracks, three of them "concert arrangements" of Ellington standards and one, "The Tattooed Bride," a recent tone poem.

Content
The album features full-length versions of Ellington's classics "Mood Indigo" (1930), "Sophisticated Lady" (1933), and "Solitude" (1934). No longer constrained by the limitations of 78s, these arrangements range from 8 to 15 minutes in length. The first two feature vocals by Eve Duke, recording under the name Yvonne Lanauze, and the third includes a climactic solo by trombonist Lawrence Brown. The newest composition, "The Tattooed Bride" (1948), gives extended space to clarinetist Jimmy Hamilton in almost concerto-like fashion. The lengthy arrangements were created by both Ellington and his longtime collaborator Billy Strayhorn.

Reception
Jazz critic Gary Giddins called the album "One of the first genuinely innovative 12-inch LPs." He noted that "Ellington eschewed the suite format in favor of continuous long-form works that reflected a liberation made possible by the LP. The vividly languorous 15-minute "Mood Indigo" (on Masterpieces) exemplifies Ellington's newfound freedom".

Ellington biographer John Edward Hasse notes that "Mood Indigo" in this updated version "goes through several meters (one section is in waltz time), three keys, and effective contrasts in sonorities, densities, and timbres. What variety Ellington and Strayhorn could manage from the sixteen-piece orchestra and from a familiar short song!" He also notes that "The Tattooed Bride is considered by some critics as one of Ellington's most effective extended works."

The AllMusic review by Bruce Eder awarded the album 4½ stars and stated: "For the first time in his recording career, Ellington was able to forego the three-minutes-and-change restrictions in running time of the 78-rpm disc — he and the band rose to the occasion."

Release history 
The original 1951 release under the "Columbia Masterworks" banner featured a red cover which was replaced by the more modern blue cover in 1956. The album was re-released on CD in 2004 with additional bonus tracks recorded at later sessions.

Track listing

Bonus tracks on CD reissue

Personnel
Duke Ellington, Billy Strayhorn – piano
Cat Anderson (tracks 1-4, 6 & 7), Shorty Baker, Mercer Ellington (tracks 1-4), Fats Ford (tracks 1-4), Ray Nance, Nelson Williams - trumpet
Lawrence Brown (tracks 1-4), Tyree Glenn (tracks 1-4), Quentin Jackson, Britt Woodman (tracks 5-7) - trombone
Jimmy Hamilton - clarinet, tenor saxophone
Johnny Hodges (tracks 1-4), Willie Smith (tracks 5-7) - alto saxophone
Russell Procope - alto saxophone, clarinet
Paul Gonsalves - tenor saxophone
Harry Carney - baritone saxophone, bass clarinet (track 2)
Wendell Marshall - bass
Sonny Greer (tracks 1-4), Louis Bellson (tracks 5-7) - drums
Yvonne Lanauze - vocals

References

Columbia Records albums
Duke Ellington albums
1951 albums
Albums recorded at CBS 30th Street Studio